Killbox 13 is the 12th studio album by thrash metal band Overkill, released in 2003. It is the first album with rhythm guitarist Derek Tailer. The name stems from the fact that the band considers this to be their thirteenth release because they include the Overkill EP as their first, or that they had released the covers album Coverkill, which would have been their eleventh studio album. "Well, it is the thirteenth, but it's only really the thirteenth for people who followed the band. There was an EP called Overkill back in '84...", said Bobby Ellsworth.

Killbox 13 received much critical acclaim because some of the songs marked a return to the raw unpolished thrash style exhibited on the first album Feel The Fire, which Overkill had gradually moved away from afterwards.

Track listing

Credits
Bobby "Blitz" Ellsworth – lead vocals
D.D. Verni – bass, backing vocals
Dave Linsk – lead guitar
Derek Tailer – rhythm guitar
Tim Mallare – drums

Production
 Produced by Colin Richardson and Overkill

Charts

References

External links
 Official OVERKILL Site

Overkill (band) albums
2003 albums
Spitfire Records albums
Albums with cover art by Travis Smith (artist)